The Spitfire is a 1924 American silent society drama film directed by Christy Cabanne and starring Betty Blythe and Lowell Sherman.

Cast

Preservation
With no prints of The Spitfire located in any film archive, it is a lost film.

References

External links

Lobby card at gettyimages.com

1924 films
American silent feature films
Lost American films
Films directed by Christy Cabanne
Films based on American novels
Silent American drama films
1924 drama films
American black-and-white films
1924 lost films
Lost drama films
Associated Exhibitors films
1920s American films